The Norwegian Museum of Travel and Tourism is a museum located in Sogndal in Vestland county, Norway. The main aim of the museum is to exhibit the history of tourism in Norway from the beginning of the boom in the 19th century, and until today. It is a unit of Museums of Sogn og Fjordane.

Current exhibitions (2016)

Tourism and Travel in Norway 

A historical exhibition of the phenomenon of tourism in Norway since the 19th century. The exhibition makes frequent use of multi-media platforms to engage the spectator.

The Art colony in Balestrand 

A historical exhibition about the Norwegian and international artists who came to Balestrand for inspiration, and thus contributed to the location's appeal as a tourist destination.

The Norwegian National Tourist Routes 

This exhibition displays the National Tourist Routes with maps, pictures, movies, and sculptures.

History of the museum
Founded in 1986 as the Western Norwegian Museum of Travel and Tourism, the museum has consisted of several historic buildings on Balestrand pier since 1993. These have been the exhibition locales awaiting the opening of a dedicated museum building. Since 29 April 2016, the new building has been open to the public.

References

External links
 Museum website

1986 establishments in Norway
Museums established in 1986
Museums in Vestland
History museums in Norway
Historic house museums in Norway
Tourism in Norway
Sogndal